Cavallotti is an Italian surname. Notable people with the surname include:

  (born 1967), Italian actress
 Felice Cavallotti (1842–1898), Italian politician, poet, and author
 Maximiliano Cavallotti (born 1984), Argentinian footballer
 Rubén W. Cavallotti (1924–1999), Argentinian film director